Manuel Stewart (July 30, 1922 – May 27, 1954) was an American Negro league third baseman in the 1940s.

A native of Chester, South Carolina, Stewart played for the Baltimore Elite Giants in 1946. He died in Elizabeth, New Jersey in 1954 at age 31.

References

External links
 and Seamheads

1922 births
1954 deaths
Baltimore Elite Giants players
Baseball third basemen
Baseball players from South Carolina
People from Chester, South Carolina
20th-century African-American sportspeople